Philip Mango (born 28 August 1995) is a Solomon Islands footballer who plays as a goalkeeper for the Solomon Warriors. He is 1.78 meters tall.

International career
He made his debut for the national team on March 24, 2016 in their 2–0 victory against Papua New Guinea.

He was also called up to the national futsal team squad for the 2016 FIFA Futsal World Cup.

Private
Mango identifies Spain goalkeeper Iker Casillas and former Solomon Islands national goalkeeper Shadrack Ramoni as the two men he looks up to.

References

External links

 

Living people
1995 births
Association football goalkeepers
Solomon Islands international footballers
Solomon Islands footballers
People from Honiara
Marist F.C. players